3rd World Soundtrack Awards
October 11, 2003

Best Original Soundtrack:
 Frida
The 3rd World Soundtrack Awards were awarded on 12 October 2003 in Ghent, Belgium.

Winners
Soundtrack Composer of the Year:
Elliot Goldenthal - Frida
Best Original Soundtrack of the Year:
Frida - Elliot Goldenthal
Best Original Song Written for a Film:
"The Hands That Built America" - Gangs of New York
Composed by Adam Clayton, The Edge, Bono, Larry Mullen, Jr.
Discovery of the Year:
Antonio Pinto - Cidade de Deus (City of God)
Lifetime Achievement Award:
Maurice Jarre

References 

0